Qarah Khan Bandi (also Romanized as Qarah Khān Bandī) is a village in Garmkhan Rural District, Garmkhan District, Bojnord County, North Khorasan Province, Iran. At the 2006 census, its population was 653, in 170 families.

References 

Populated places in Bojnord County